Quietism may refer to:
 Quietism (Christian philosophy), a 17th-century Christian philosophy condemned as heresy by the Roman Catholic Church
 Quietism (philosophy), the view that the proper role of philosophy is a broadly therapeutic or remedial one
 Political quietism, the religious rejection of politics
 Political quietism in Islam